Bidens discoidea, the small beggarticks, is a North American species of flowering plant in the family Asteraceae. It is widespread across eastern Canada and the eastern and central United States, from Nova Scotia west to Minnesota, south to Florida and Texas.

Bidens discoidea  is an annual  herb up to 180 cm (72 inches) tall. It produces as many as 3 flower heads containing orange disc florets but no ray florets. The species grows in marshes and other wet sites.

References

External links

discoidea
Flora of North America
Plants described in 1842